Brazil is a 1985 dystopian black comedy film directed by Terry Gilliam and written by Gilliam, Charles McKeown, and Tom Stoppard. The film stars Jonathan Pryce and features Robert De Niro, Kim Greist, Michael Palin, Katherine Helmond, Bob Hoskins, and Ian Holm.

The film centres on Sam Lowry, a low-ranking bureaucrat trying to find a woman who appears in his dreams while he is working in a mind-numbing job and living in a small apartment, set in a dystopian world in which there is an over-reliance on poorly maintained (and rather whimsical) machines. Brazils satire of technocracy, bureaucracy, hyper-surveillance, corporate statism, and state capitalism is reminiscent of George Orwell's 1949 novel Nineteen Eighty-Four, and has been called Kafkaesque, as well as absurdist.

Sarah Street's British National Cinema (1997) describes the film as a "fantasy/satire on bureaucratic society", and John Scalzi's Rough Guide to Sci-Fi Movies (2005) describes it as a "dystopian satire". Jack Mathews, a film critic and the author of The Battle of Brazil (1987), described the film as "satirizing the bureaucratic, largely dysfunctional industrial world that had been driving Gilliam crazy all his life". Despite its title, the film is not about the country Brazil nor does it take place there; it is named after the recurrent theme song, Ary Barroso's "Aquarela do Brasil", known simply as "Brazil" to British audiences, as performed by Geoff Muldaur.

Though a success in Europe, the film was unsuccessful in its initial North American release. It has since become a cult film. In 1999, the British Film Institute voted Brazil the 54th greatest British film of all time. In 2017, a poll of 150 actors, directors, writers, producers, and critics for Time Out magazine saw it ranked the 24th best British film ever.

Plot
In a dystopian, polluted, hyper-consumerist, overbearing bureaucratic totalitarian future somewhere in the 20th century, Sam Lowry is a low-level government employee who frequently dreams of himself as a winged warrior saving a damsel in distress. One day, shortly before Christmas, an insect becomes jammed in a teleprinter, which misprints a copy of an arrest warrant it was receiving. This leads to the arrest and death during interrogation of cobbler Archibald Buttle instead of renegade heating engineer and suspected terrorist Archibald Tuttle.

Sam discovers the mistake when he discovers the wrong bank account had been debited for the arrest. He visits Buttle's widow to give her the refund where he catches a glimpse of her upstairs neighbour Jill Layton, a truck driver, and is astonished to discover that Jill resembles the woman from his dreams. Sam frantically tries to approach Jill, but she disappears before he can find her. Jill has been trying to help Mrs Buttle establish what happened to her husband, but her efforts have been obstructed by bureaucracy. Unbeknownst to her, she is now considered a terrorist accomplice of Tuttle for attempting to report the wrongful arrest of Buttle.

Meanwhile, Sam reports a fault in his apartment's air conditioning. Central Services are uncooperative, but then Tuttle, who used to work for Central Services but left because of his dislike of the tedious and repetitive paperwork now working as freelancing heating engineer (which is considered illegal), unexpectedly comes to his assistance. Tuttle repairs Sam's air conditioning, but when two Central Services workers, Spoor and Dowser, arrive, Sam has to stall to let Tuttle escape. The workers later return to demolish Sam's ducts and seize his apartment under the pretence of fixing the system.

Sam discovers that Jill's records have been classified and the only way to access them is to be promoted to Information Retrieval. He had previously turned down a promotion arranged by his high-ranking mother, Ida, who is obsessed with the rejuvenating plastic surgery of cosmetic surgeon Dr Jaffe. Sam retracts his refusal by speaking with Deputy Minister Mr Helpmann at a party hosted by Ida. After obtaining Jill's records, Sam tracks her down before she can be arrested. Sam clumsily confesses his love to Jill, and they cause mayhem as they escape government agents. They stop at a mall and are frightened by a terrorist bombing (part of a campaign that has been occurring around the city), then government agents arrive and take Sam. He awakens briefly detained in police custody.

At work, Sam is chastised by his new boss Mr Warrenn for his lack of productivity. Sam returns home to find that the two Central Services workers have repossessed his apartment. Tuttle then appears in secret and helps Sam enact revenge on Spoor and Dowser by filling their hazmat suits with raw sewage. Jill finds Sam outside his apartment and the two take refuge in Ida's unoccupied home. Sam falsifies government records to indicate her death, allowing her to escape pursuit. The two share a romantic night together, but in the morning are apprehended by the government at gunpoint. Sam is told that Jill was killed while resisting arrest. Charged with treason for abusing his new position, Sam is restrained in a chair in a large, empty cylindrical room, to be tortured by his old friend, Jack Lint.

As Jack is about to start the torture, Tuttle and other members of the resistance break into the Ministry, shooting Jack, rescuing Sam, and blowing up the Ministry building. Sam and Tuttle flee together, but Tuttle disappears amid a mass of scraps of paperwork from the destroyed building. Sam stumbles into the funeral of Ida's friend, who has died following botched cosmetic surgery. Sam discovers that his mother now resembles Jill, and is too busy being fawned over by young men to care about her son's plight. Government agents disrupt the funeral, and Sam falls into the open casket. Through a black void he lands in a street from his daydreams, and tries to escape police and monsters by climbing a pile of flex-ducts. Opening a door, he passes through it and is surprised to find himself in a truck driven by Jill. The two leave the city together. However, this "happy ending" is a delusion: it is revealed that Sam is still strapped to the torture chair. Realising that Sam has descended into irrecoverable insanity, Jack and Mr Helpmann declare him a lost cause and leave the room. Sam remains in the chair, smiling and humming "Aquarela do Brasil" to himself.

Cast

Main cast
 Jonathan Pryce as Sam Lowry. Pryce has described the role as the highlight of his career, along with that of Lytton Strachey in Carrington. Tom Cruise was also considered for the role.
 Kim Greist as Jill Layton. Gilliam's first choice for the part was Ellen Barkin; also considered were Jamie Lee Curtis, Rebecca De Mornay, Rae Dawn Chong, Joanna Pacuła, Rosanna Arquette, Kelly McGillis, and Madonna. Gilliam was reportedly dissatisfied with Greist's performance, and chose to cut or edit some of her scenes as a result.
 Robert De Niro as Archibald "Harry" Tuttle. De Niro still wanted a part in the film after being denied that of Jack Lint, so Gilliam offered him the smaller role of Tuttle.
 Katherine Helmond as Mrs Ida Lowry. According to Helmond, Gilliam called her and said, "I have a part for you, and I want you to come over and do it, but you're not going to look very nice in it." The make-up was applied by Gilliam's wife, Maggie. During production, Helmond spent ten hours a day with a mask glued to her face; her scenes had to be postponed due to the blisters this caused.
 Ian Holm as Mr Kurtzmann, Sam's boss
 Bob Hoskins as Spoor, a government-employed heating engineer who resents Harry Tuttle
 Michael Palin as Jack Lint. Robert De Niro read the script and expressed interest in the role, but Gilliam had already promised the part to Palin, a friend and regular collaborator. Palin described the character as "someone who was everything that Jonathan Pryce's character wasn't: he's stable, he had a family, he was settled, comfortable, hard-working, charming, sociable – and utterly and totally unscrupulous. That was the way we felt we could bring out the evil in Jack Lint."
 Ian Richardson as Mr Warrenn, Sam's new boss at Information Retrieval
 Peter Vaughan as Mr Eugene Helpmann, the Deputy Minister of Information

Supporting cast

Cameos
 Co-writer Charles McKeown as Harvey Lime, Sam's co-worker.
 Director Terry Gilliam as the smoking man at Shang-ri La Towers.

Production

Writing
Gilliam developed the story and wrote the first draft of the screenplay with Charles Alverson, who was paid for his work but was ultimately uncredited in the final film. For nearly 20 years, Gilliam denied that Alverson had made any material contribution to the script. When the first draft was published and original in-progress documents emerged from Alverson's files, however, Gilliam begrudgingly changed his story. This was too late for either credit on the film or a listing on the failed Oscar nomination for Alverson; he has said that he would not have minded the Oscar nomination, even though he didn't think much of the script or the finished film. Gilliam, McKeown, and Stoppard collaborated on further drafts. Brazil was developed under the titles The Ministry and 1984 ½, the latter a nod not only to Orwell's original Nineteen Eighty-Four but also to 8½ directed by Federico Fellini; Gilliam often cites Fellini as one of the defining influences on his visual style. During the film's production, other working titles floated about, including The Ministry of Torture, How I Learned to Live with the System—So Far, and So That's Why the Bourgeoisie Sucks, before settling with Brazil, relating to the name of its escapist signature tune.

In an interview with Salman Rushdie, Gilliam stated:

Gilliam sometimes refers to this film as the second in his "Trilogy of Imagination" films, starting with Time Bandits (1981) and ending with The Adventures of Baron Munchausen (1988). All are about the "craziness of our awkwardly ordered society and the desire to escape it through whatever means possible." All three movies focus on these struggles and attempts to escape them through imagination—Time Bandits, through the eyes of a child, Brazil, through the eyes of a man in his thirties, and Munchausen, through the eyes of an elderly man. In 2013, Gilliam also called Brazil the first instalment of a dystopian satire trilogy it forms with 1995's 12 Monkeys and 2013's The Zero Theorem (though he later denied having said this).

Gilliam has stated that Brazil was inspired by George Orwell's Nineteen Eighty-Four—which he has admitted never having read—but is written from a contemporary perspective rather than looking to the future as Orwell did. In Gilliam's words, his film was "the Nineteen Eighty-Four for 1984." Critics and analysts have pointed out many similarities and differences between the two, an example being that contrary to Winston Smith, Sam Lowry's spirit did not capitulate as he sank into complete catatonia. The film's ending bears a strong similarity to the short story "An Occurrence at Owl Creek Bridge" by Ambrose Bierce. The tragicomic tone and philosophy of the film bear many resemblances to absurdist drama, a genre for which Brazil co-writer Tom Stoppard is widely acclaimed.

Production design

Michael Atkinson of The Village Voice wrote, "Gilliam understood that all futuristic films end up quaintly evoking the naïve past in which they were made, and turned the principle into a coherent comic aesthetic." In the second version of the script, Gilliam and Alverson described the film's setting like this: "It is neither future nor past, and yet a bit of each. It is neither East nor West, but could be Belgrade or Scunthorpe on a drizzly day in February. Or Cicero, Illinois, seen through the bottom of a beer bottle." In the 1988 documentary The Birth of Brazil, Gilliam said that he always explained the film as taking place "everywhere in the 20th century, whatever that means, on the Los Angeles/Belfast border, whatever that means". Pneumatic tubes are a frequent sight throughout the film.

The result is an anachronistic technology, "a view of what the 1980s might have looked like as viewed from the perspective of a 1940s filmmaker" which has been dubbed "retro-futurism" by fellow filmmakers Jean-Pierre Jeunet and Marc Caro. It is a mixture of styles and production designs derived from Fritz Lang's films (particularly Metropolis and M) or film noir pictures starring Humphrey Bogart: "On the other hand, Sam's reality has a '40s noir feel. Some sequences are shot to recall images of Humphrey Bogart on the hunt and one character (Harvey Lime) may be named as an homage to The Third Man Harry Lime." A number of reviewers also saw a distinct influence of German Expressionism, as the 1920s seminal, more nightmarish, predecessor to 1940s film noir, in general in how Gilliam made use of lighting and set designs. A brief sequence towards the end, in which resistance fighters flee from government soldiers on the steps of the Ministry, pays homage to the Odessa Steps sequence in Sergei Eisenstein's Battleship Potemkin (1925). Strong references exist to the overcomplicated humoristic machinery of British illustrator W. Heath Robinson, published between 1915 and 1942. The grotesque sets were based on George Grosz's paintings of 1920s Berlin.

The lighting and set design was coupled with Gilliam's trademark obsession for very wide lenses and tilted camera angles; going unusually wide for an audience used to mainstream Hollywood productions, Gilliam made the film's wide-angle shots with 14mm (Zeiss), 11mm, and 9.8mm (Kinoptik) lenses, the latter being a recent technological innovation at the time as one of the first lenses of that short a focal length that did not fish-eye. In fact, over the years, the 14mm lens has become informally known as "The Gilliam" among filmmakers due to the director's frequent use of it since Brazil.

Many of the film's exterior scenes are filmed in Les Espaces d'Abraxas in Noisy-le-Grand near Paris, a monumental apartment complex designed by Ricardo Bofill Taller de Arquitectura.

The numbering of form , without which no work can be done by repairmen of the Department of Central Services, is an allusion to George Orwell's flat at 27B Canonbury Square, London (up six half-flights of stairs), where he lived while writing parts of Nineteen Eighty-Four.

Music
Geoff Muldaur performed a version of Ary Barroso's most famous 1939 song "Aquarela do Brasil" ("Watercolor of Brazil", often simply called "Brazil" in English). The song is a musical ode to the Brazilian motherland. Geoff Muldaur uses the song as a leitmotif in the film, although other background music is also used. Michael Kamen's arrangement and orchestration of Barroso's song for Brazil made it more pliable to late 20th-century tastes to the extent that film trailer composers often use it in contexts that have little to do with Brazil and more to do with Gilliam's dystopian vision. Kamen, who scored the film, originally recorded "Brazil" with vocals by Kate Bush. This recording was not included in the actual film or the original soundtrack release; however, it has been subsequently released on re-pressings of the soundtrack. Gilliam recalls drawing the inspiration to use the song as follows:

Sylvia Albertazzi, in her article "Salman Rushdie's 'The location of Brazil'. The Imaginary homelands of the Fantastic Literature", stresses even further the importance that the soundtrack had upon the movie's plot and meaning. She suggests "... the opening question 'where is Gilliam's Brazil?', may be answered, quite literally, 'in a song'; just as it is in a song that there is to be found that world where 'all fall down' in children's games".

Release

Battle for final cut
The film was produced by Arnon Milchan's company Embassy International Pictures. Gilliam's original cut of the film is 142 minutes long and ends on a dark note. This version was released in Europe and internationally by 20th Century Fox without issue; however, US distribution was handled by Universal, whose executives felt the ending tested poorly. Universal chairman Sid Sheinberg insisted on a dramatic re-edit of the film to give it a happy ending, and suggested testing both versions to see which scored higher. At one point, there were two editing teams working on the film, one without Gilliam's knowledge. As with the science fiction film Blade Runner (1982), which had been released three years earlier, a version of Brazil was created by the studio with a more consumer-friendly ending.

After a lengthy delay with no sign of the film being released, Gilliam took out a full-page ad in the trade magazine Variety urging Sheinberg to release Brazil in its intended version. Sheinberg spoke publicly of his dispute with Gilliam in interviews and ran his own advertisement in Daily Variety offering to sell the film. Gilliam conducted private screenings of Brazil (without the studio's approval) for film schools and local critics. On the same night Universal's award contender Out of Africa premiered in New York, Brazil was awarded the Los Angeles Film Critics Association awards for "Best Picture", "Best Screenplay", and "Best Director". This prompted Universal to finally agree to release a modified 132-minute version supervised by Gilliam, in 1985.

Reception
On review aggregator Rotten Tomatoes, the film holds an approval rating of 98% based on 50 reviews, with an average rating of 8.7/10. The website's critical consensus reads, "Brazil, Terry Gilliam's visionary Orwellian fantasy, is an audacious dark comedy, filled with strange, imaginative visuals." On Metacritic, the film received a score of 84 based on 18 reviews, indicating "universal acclaim".

Los Angeles Times critic Kenneth Turan described the film as "the most potent piece of satiric political cinema since Dr. Strangelove". Janet Maslin of The New York Times was very positive towards the film upon its release, stating "Terry Gilliam's Brazil, a jaunty, wittily observed vision of an extremely bleak future, is a superb example of the power of comedy to underscore serious ideas, even solemn ones."

Roger Ebert was less enthusiastic in the Chicago Sun-Times, giving the film two out of four stars and claiming that it was "hard to follow". He felt the film lacked a confident grasp on its characters' roles in a story "awash in elaborate special effects, sensational sets, apocalyptic scenes of destruction and a general lack of discipline". Ebert wrote positively of certain scenes, especially one in which "Sam moves into half an office and finds himself engaged in a tug-of-war over his desk with the man through the wall. I was reminded of a Chaplin film, Modern Times, and reminded, too, that in Chaplin economy and simplicity were virtues, not the enemy."

Colin Greenland reviewed Brazil for Imagine magazine, and stated that it was "a daring, exorbitant Vision, sombrely funny and darkly true."

Accolades
In 2004, Total Film named Brazil the 20th-greatest British movie of all time. In 2005, Time film reviewers Richard Corliss and Richard Schickel included Brazil in an unordered list of the 100 best films of all time. In 2006, Channel 4 voted Brazil one of the "50 Films to See Before You Die", shortly before its broadcast on FilmFour. The film also ranks at number 83 in Empire magazine's list of the 500 Greatest Films of All Time.

Wired ranked Brazil number 5 in its list of the top 20 sci-fi movies. Entertainment Weekly listed Brazil as the sixth-best science-fiction piece of media released since 1982. The magazine also ranked the film No. 13 on their list of "The Top 50 Cult Films".

The film was nominated for two Academy Awards, for Best Original Screenplay and Best Art Direction (Norman Garwood, Maggie Gray).

According to Gilliam in an interview with Clive James in his online programme Talking in the Library, Brazil is – to his surprise – apparently a favourite film of the far right in America.

Home media
Brazil has been released several times by The Criterion Collection, as a five-disc LaserDisc set in 1996, a three-disc DVD set in 1999, and a two-disc Blu-ray set in 2012, all with the same special features: a 142-minute cut of the film (referred to by Gilliam as the "fifth and final cut"), Sheinberg's 94-minute "Love Conquers All" cut for syndicated television, and various galleries and featurettes.

Criterion also released a one-disc, movie-only edition in 2006, while the three-disc set was revised to be compatible with widescreen televisions

A Blu-ray of the 132-minute US version of the movie was released in the US on 12 July 2011 by Universal Pictures. It contains only that version of the film and no extra features.

Legacy

Film
Other films which have drawn inspiration from Brazil cinematography, art design, and overall atmosphere include Jean-Pierre Jeunet's and Marc Caro's films Delicatessen (1991) and The City of Lost Children (1995), Rocky Morton and Annabel Jankel's Super Mario Bros. (1993), the Coen brothers' The Hudsucker Proxy (1994), and Alex Proyas's Dark City (1998).

The production design and lighting style of Tim Burton's Batman (1989) have been compared to Brazil. Tim Burton and production designer Anton Furst studied Brazil as a reference for Batman.

The ending of Neil Marshall's The Descent (2005) was greatly inspired by Brazil, as Marshall explained in an interview:

Jupiter Ascending (2015) features a scene deliberately designed to resemble the bureaucracy in Brazil, featuring Terry Gilliam in a cameo role and a reference to a "statute 27B-stroke-6".

Star Wars: The Last Jedi (2017) was also heavily inspired by Brazil, both in its production design and its themes. The planet of Canto Bight is aesthetically similar to Brazil. Both films also share several themes, showing the ambivalence of the wealthy in the face of a world falling apart and a society unaware of the conflict surrounding them. A direct reference to the film can be heard when Finn and Rose are arrested for Parking Violation 27B/6, a nod to form 27B/6 without which no work can be done by repairmen of the Department of Public Works. Another reference can be heard in the film's soundtrack, as the Canto Bight Theme composed by John Williams briefly samples "Aquarela do Brasil", making it one of the few times that a Star Wars soundtrack incorporated a song from outside the Star Wars universe.

Television
Production design of the Time Variance Authority depicted in the Disney+ series Loki was inspired by the "fun sci-fi bureaucracy" and dystopian design elements of Brazil Ministry of Information.

Technology
The highly technological aesthetics of Brazil inspired the set design of Max Cohen's apartment in the film Pi. Brazil also served as an inspiration for the film Sucker Punch (2011), and has been recognised as an inspiration for writers and artists of the steampunk subculture.

The dystopian premise of the 2018 video game We Happy Few was largely inspired by Brazil.

See also
 BFI Top 100 British films
 List of films featuring surveillance
 List of films cut over the director's opposition

Notes

References

Further reading
 Bruce Krajewski, "Postmodernism, Allegory, and Hermeneutics in Brazil, in Traveling with Hermes: Hermeneutics and Rhetoric (1992), .
 Jack Mathews, The Battle of Brazil (1987), .

External links

 
 
 
 
 Brazil at the Encyclopedia of Science Fiction
 Wide Angle Closeup: The Terry Gilliam Files – Interviews and production stories on Brazil
 Brazil Screenplay, Terry Gilliam, Tom Stoppard & Charles McKeown, Daily Script website
 DGA magazine interview with Gilliam
 Hamel, James Keith. Modernity and Mise-en-scene: Terry Gilliam and Brazil, from Images: Journal of Film and Popular Culture
 Brazil: A Great Place to Visit, Wouldn't Want to Live There an essay by David Sterritt at the Criterion Collection

1980s black comedy films
1980s dystopian films
1980s political films
1980s satirical films
1980s science fiction comedy films
1985 films
BAFTA winners (films)
British fantasy drama films
British neo-noir films
British political satire films
British satirical films
Films about bureaucracy
Films about dreams
Films about simulated reality
Films about terrorism
Films about totalitarianism
Films based on Nineteen Eighty-Four
Films directed by Terry Gilliam
Films scored by Michael Kamen
Films set in the 20th century
Films with screenplays by Charles McKeown
Films with screenplays by Terry Gilliam
Films with screenplays by Tom Stoppard
Regency Enterprises films
Retrofuturism
Santa Claus in film
Torture in films
Films produced by Arnon Milchan
1980s English-language films
1980s British films
Surreal comedy films